"She Used to Love Me a Lot" is a song recorded by American country music artist David Allan Coe. It was released in December 1984 as the lead single from Coe's album Darlin', Darlin. The song peaked at #11 on both the U.S. Billboard Hot Country Singles chart and the Canadian RPM Country Tracks chart. It was written by Dennis Morgan, Charles Quillen, and Kye Fleming. A version of the song by Johnny Cash was recorded in the early 1980s, but remained unreleased until 2014 (on Out Among the Stars).

Chart performance

References

1984 singles
David Allan Coe songs
Johnny Cash songs
Song recordings produced by Billy Sherrill
Songs written by Dennis Morgan (songwriter)
Songs written by Kye Fleming
Songs written by Charles Quillen
1984 songs
2014 singles